Elaine Terranova (born 1939 in Philadelphia) is an American poet.

Life
She grew up in Philadelphia, the daughter of Nathan and Sadie Goldstein. She remained in her home town gaining her education at Temple University where she graduated in 1961 with a bachelor's degree in English. She also married her first husband Philip Terranova that same year. Twelve years later in 1973, she worked as a manuscript editor for J. B. Lippincott & Co. While working there, she attended Vermont's Goddard College culminating in earning her master's degree in 1977. Her career shifted from editing to education and she began teaching English and creative writing at Temple University until 1987.

She developed a passion for writing poetry and began publishing her works while continuing to teach. Her poems have appeared in various publications including The New Yorker, The American Poetry Review, Prairie Schooner, Virginia Quarterly Review, and Ploughshares.

In 2001, “The Choice,” a selection from Damages (Copper Canyon Press, 1996), appeared throughout Philadelphia as a part of the Poetry Society’s Poetry in Motion (arts program). “The River Bathers,” from Damages, was featured on illustrated posters by the Public Poetry Project.

On November 8, 2012, University of Pennsylvania's Kelly Writers House inaugurated the Eva and Leo Sussman Poetry Program with poetry readings by featured guest writers and instructors, Elaine Terranova, Nathalie Anderson, and Joan Hutton Landis. Here, Elaine reads from her 2012 book, Dames Rocket.

She lives in Philadelphia.

Awards
 1990 Walt Whitman Award of the Academy of American Poets, chosen by Rita Dove
 1992 Robert Frost Fellowship in Poetry, Bread Loaf Writers' Conference
 1993 “The Stand-up Shtel” took first prize in the Anna Davidson Rosenberg Competition for poems on the Jewish experience.
 2006 Pew Fellowships in the Arts
 2012 Pushcart Prize

Works
  chapbook
 
 
 
 
  chapbook

Translations

References

External links
 Taking Tap at Miss Paterson’s. Broadcast by New American Radio, 1990.

1939 births
Living people
Writers from Philadelphia
Temple University alumni
Goddard College alumni
Sweet Briar College faculty
Temple University faculty
Pew Fellows in the Arts
American women poets
American women academics
21st-century American women